The R341 is a Regional Route in South Africa that connects the N12 at De Rust in the west and the N9 between Uniondale and Willowmore in the east. Just before reaching the N9, it meets the northern terminus of the R339

External links
 Routes Travel Info

References

Regional Routes in the Western Cape